Flávio Sérgio Viana known as Schumacher (born in São Paulo, 31 August 1975) is a Brazilian futsal player. He was elected as the 2008 World's Best Futsal Player. His nickname is a reference to German football goalkeeper Harald Schumacher.

References

External links
 Profile at Inter Movistar homepage

1975 births
Living people
Brazilian men's futsal players
Brazilian expatriate sportspeople in Spain
Futsal defenders
Inter FS players